The Exes is an American sitcom that premiered on November 30, 2011, on TV Land. The series follows divorce attorney Holly (Kristen Johnston) who introduces her client, Stuart (David Alan Basche), to two new roommates, Haskell (Wayne Knight) and Phil (Donald Faison), who are divorced men that share an apartment owned by Holly.

A total of 64 episodes of The Exes have aired, with the show concluding in the 4th season following cancellation by the network.

Series overview
{| class="wikitable" style="text-align:center"
|-
! colspan="2" rowspan="2"| Seasons
! rowspan="2"| Episodes
! colspan="2"| Originally aired 
|-
! First aired
! Last aired
|-
| style="background:#fa3; color:#100; text-align:center;"| 
| 1
| 10
| 
| 
|-
| style="background:#3699F6; color:#100; text-align:center;"| 
| 2
| 12
| 
| 
|-
| style="background:#99EE00; color:#100; text-align:center;"| 
| 3
| 20
| 
| 
|-
| style="background:#762BC5; color:#100; text-align:center;"| 
| 4
| 22
| 
|  
|}

Episodes

Season 1 (2011–12)

Season 2 (2012)

Season 3 (2013–14)

Season 4 (2014–15)

References

External links
 Official episode guide at TV Land
 

Lists of American sitcom episodes